Sidaway is a surname. Notable people with the name include:
Ashley Sidaway, British screenwriter and producer
Geoffrey Sidaway (1942–2014), British clergyman 
Marlene Sidaway (born 1937), British television and film actress 
Robert Sidaway (1758–1809), Australian convict of the First Fleet
Robert Sidaway (actor) (born 1942), British actor and writer

See also 
Sidaway v Board of Governors of the Bethlem Royal Hospital, 1985 English court case
Sideways (disambiguation)